Dugo Selo Lasinjsko is a village in central Croatia, in the municipality of Gvozd, Sisak-Moslavina County.

History
During the WWII Genocide of Serbs by the Croatian fascist Ustaše regime, on 21 December 1941, hundreds of Serbs from Dugo Selo Lasinjsko were taken to the Brezje forest and massacred.

Culture

Demographics
According to the 2011 census, the village of Dugo Selo Lasinjsko has 46 inhabitants. This represents 11.95% of its pre-war population according to the 1991 census.

According to the 1991 census, 91.17% of the village population were ethnic Serbs (351/385),  1.30% were ethnic Croats (5/385), while 7.53% were of other ethnic origin (29/385).

Notable natives and residents

References

Populated places in Sisak-Moslavina County
Serb communities in Croatia